Courtney Neron is an American politician from Oregon. A Democrat, she represents District 26 in the Oregon House of Representatives, which is currently assembled for its 81st legislative session.  This district is located in northern Oregon and includes portions of Clackamas County and Washington County. She was first elected in 2018.

Early life and career
Neron was born in Tigard, Oregon and attended the University of Oregon.  She taught high school French and Spanish.

Political career

Neron was named as the replacement candidate for the district on July 28, 2018, after Ryan Spiker dropped out after winning the Democratic primary. In the general election, Neron defeated her Republican opponent, incumbent representative Rich Vial, securing 50.8% of the vote to become the new Representative for the district. With her election she became the first Democrat to represent the district in 18 years, the last being Kathy Lowe, who served in the Legislature from 2000 to 2002.

She sits on the House Education Committee, the House Committee on Early Childhood, and the House Committee on Housing, during the 81st session.

Personal life
Neron lives in Wilsonville with her husband, Joe, and their two children.

References

Democratic Party members of the Oregon House of Representatives
Living people
University of Oregon alumni
People from Wilsonville, Oregon
Politicians from Tigard, Oregon
Educators from Oregon
American women educators
Year of birth missing (living people)
21st-century American women